División de Plata de Balonmano, is the second level handball league in Spain. It was founded in 1994 and is managed by RFEBM. From 1994 until 2008–09 season, this competition was known as División de Honor B. From 2009–10 season onwards, it's officially known as División de Plata.

The División de Plata, which is played under EHF rules, currently consists of 16 teams, including ones like Academia Octavio, Calmec Barakaldo, Alcobendas, and Pozoblanco.

Competition rules 

The championship consist of 16 teams playing each other twice for a total of 30 matchdays. At end of regular season, the top team in the standings is promoted to Liga ASOBAL. Teams in 2nd, 3rd, 4th and 5th place play the promotion playoff for a single spot in Liga ASOBAL. Bottom  three teams are relegated to Primera División Estatal.

Points during regular season are awarded as following;

Each victory adds 2 points to the winner team.

Each drawn adds 1 point to each team.

2015–16 season teams

2014–15 regular season standings

Teams promoted by year

References

External links 
 Official Website of Real Federación Española de Balonmano
 The ASOBAL Magazine, "balonmano"
 Document for handball "balonmano" trainers

 
2
Professional sports leagues in Spain